The men's 100 metre backstroke events at the 2020 World Para Swimming European Championships were held at the Penteada Olympic Pools Complex in Funchal, Madeira, Portugal between 16–22 May 2021.

Medalists

Results

S1

S2

S6
Heats

Final

S7

S8

S9

S10

S11

S12
Final

S13

S14

References

2020 World Para Swimming European Championships